Mehmet Emin Çolakoğlu (1878 – 6 August 1939) was an officer of the Ottoman Army and a general of the Turkish Army.

See also
List of high-ranking commanders of the Turkish War of Independence

Sources

External links

1873 births
1939 deaths
People from Şebinkarahisar
Ottoman Imperial School of Military Engineering alumni
Ottoman Army officers
Ottoman military personnel of the Balkan Wars
Ottoman military personnel of World War I
Turkish military personnel of the Turkish–Armenian War
Turkish Army generals
Recipients of the Liakat Medal
Recipients of the Medal of Independence with Red Ribbon (Turkey)